Lawrence "Larry" Friedland (born 1938/1939) is an American billionaire property developer, particularly known for his ownership of more than 20 buildings on New York City's Madison Avenue.

Early life
Friedland was studying to become a pharmacist in the late 1950s when he met Nathan Miller and switched to property.

Career
In 1960, he and his late brother Melvin founded Friedland Properties. His first purchase was in 1962 with the help of Miller, when he bought a number of stores in Harlem including a Bickford’s Coffee Shop, and "needed three mortgages and a loan to pay the $400,000 price tag".

He owns more than 20 buildings on New York City's Madison Avenue, as well as parking garages, parking lots and two luxury apartment buildings in the city. As of October 2015, Bloomberg calculates that his half share of Friedland Properties is worth $1.5 billion.

Personal life
He is married to Marilyn Friedland, and they own a $9.2 million mansion at 50 Wyandanch Lane, Southampton, Long Island.

In 2002, their daughter Elizabeth Alixandra Friedland, a lawyer at Friedland Properties, married Dr. Mark Louis Meyer, the son of Barbara Meyer and Dr. Arthur Meyer of Kingston, Pennsylvania.

References

1930s births
Living people
American billionaires
American businesspeople